In graph theory, a critical graph is an undirected graph all of whose subgraphs have smaller chromatic number. In such a graph, every vertex or edge is a critical element, in the sense that its deletion would decrease the number of colors needed in a graph coloring of the given graph. The decrease in the number of colors cannot be by more than one.

Variations 
A -critical graph is a critical graph with chromatic number . A graph  with chromatic number  is -vertex-critical if each of its vertices is a critical element. Critical graphs are the minimal members in terms of chromatic number, which is a very important measure in graph theory.

Some properties of a -critical graph  with  vertices and  edges:
  has only one component.  
  is finite (this is the de Bruijn–Erdős theorem).
 The minimum degree  obeys the inequality . That is, every vertex is adjacent to at least  others. More strongly,  is -edge-connected.
 If  is a regular graph with degree , meaning every vertex is adjacent to exactly  others, then  is either the complete graph  with  vertices, or an odd-length cycle graph. This is Brooks' theorem.
 .
 .
 Either  may be decomposed into two smaller critical graphs, with an edge between every pair of vertices that includes one vertex from each of the two subgraphs, or  has at least  vertices.

As  showed, every -critical graph may be formed from a complete graph  by combining the Hajós construction with an operation that identifies two non-adjacent vertices. The graphs formed in this way always require  colors in any proper coloring.

A double-critical graph is a connected graph in which the deletion of any pair of adjacent vertices decreases the chromatic number by two. It is an open problem to determine whether  is the only double-critical -chromatic graph.

See also
Factor-critical graph

References

Further reading

Graph families
Graph coloring